Tabatinga x-littera is a species of beetle in the family Cerambycidae, and the only species in the genus Tabatinga. It was described by Lane in 1966.

References

Hemilophini
Beetles described in 1966